Mel Gibson and the Pants is an underground hip hop band based in Minneapolis, Minnesota. They released three albums in the early 2000s. Band member Ryan Olson is also a member of Digitata and Gayngs.

History
Mel Gibson and the Pants released their debut album, A Mannequin American, in 2004. Their second album, W/ Guitar, was released in 2005.

The band released the third album, Sea vs. Shining Sea, in 2007. Ira Sather-Olson of Missoula Independent said, "Sea vs. Shining Sea proves that a marriage between numerous genres can in fact create lasting results".

Discography
Albums
 A Mannequin American (2004)
 W/ Guitar (2005)
 Sea vs. Shining Sea (2007)

References

External links
 Mel Gibson and the Pants on Totally Gross National Product
 

Alternative rock groups from Minnesota
Indie rock musical groups from Minnesota
Midwest hip hop groups
Cultural depictions of Mel Gibson